Rhythm & Blues is the 16th studio album by American blues musician Buddy Guy. It was released in July 2013 under RCA Records. Rhythm & Blues marked Guy's largest first week sales in the Soundscan Era, and was his fourth album to reach No. 1 on the Top Blues Albums Chart (following 2010's Living Proof, 2008's Skin Deep, and 2001's Sweet Tea).

Commercial performance
The album debuted at No. 27 on the Billboard 200 and No. 1 on the Top Blues Albums chart. selling 10,000 copies in its first week. The album has sold 55,000 copies in the United States as of July 2015.

Musicians
 Buddy Guy - guitar, lead vocals
Guitars
 BG '89 Fender Custom Strat on (A1 to A3, A5, B1 to B3, C2 to C4, D1, D3)
 Gibson Custom 335 on (B4 to B6, C1, D4)
 Gibson Les Paul (D2)

 Tom Hambridge - drums, background vocals, tambourine (tracks: B4, D1), elephant bells
 Reese Wynans - piano (tracks: C2 to C4, D2), Hammond B3, Wurlitzer (tracks: A3, B3)
 Kevin McKendree - piano (B2, C5, D3, D5), Hammond B3, Wurlitzer (tracks: B1, B4)
 Michael Rhodes - bass (A1 to A3, A5, B6 to C3, D1, D2)
 Tommy McDonald - bass ( A4, B1 to B5, C4, C5, D3 to D5 )
 David Grissom - guitar  (A1 to A3, A5, B3, B6 to C3, D1, D2, D4)
 Rob McNelley - guitar  (A4, B1, B2, B4, B5, C5, D3, D5), slide guitar (tracks: C5)
 The McCrary Sisters - background Vocals
 Jessica Wagner-Cowan, Herschel Boone, Shannon Kurfmann - background vocals
 Wendy Moten - background vocals
 Muscle Shoals Horns - A5
 Charles Rose - trombone, horn arrangements 
 Steve Herrman - trumpet 
 Jim Horn - baritone saxophone
 Harvey Thompson - tenor saxophone

Guest musicians
 Kid Rock - vocals
 Keith Urban - guitar, vocals
 Beth Hart - vocals
 Steven Tyler - vocals
 Joe Perry - guitar
 Brad Whitford - guitar
 Gary Clark, Jr. - guitar, vocals

Personnel
 Tom Hambridge - Producer
 Chris Carmichael - Strings and string arrangement
 Recorded by Ducky Carlisle at Blackbird Studio in Nashville, Tennessee
 Mixed by Ducky Carlisle and Tom Hambridge at Ice Station Zebra in Boston, Massachusetts

Track listing

Charts

Notes

References

2013 albums
Buddy Guy albums
RCA Records albums
Albums produced by Tom Hambridge